The 2010–11 Taça da Liga was the fourth edition of the Portuguese Taça da Liga. The first matches were played on 8 August 2010. The final was played on 23 April 2011 at the Estádio Cidade de Coimbra, where Benfica beat Paços de Ferreira 2–1 to win their third title.

Format
This seasons' format consists of 3 rounds, plus knockout stages. In the first round only second division teams play. All 16 teams are allocated into four groups of four teams each. Each team plays 3 matches and top two of each group advances. In the second round, teams that qualified from previous round are joined by the two Primeira Liga promoted teams and also the six-worst in the top league in the previous season. There will be two-legged fixtures in which the winners will advance. The third round is where the remaining top eight teams from previous season first division enter the competition. Again, as in the first round, the 16 teams are divided into four groups and each team will play three matches. However this time, only group winners advance. Both semi-finals and finals are one-legged fixtures.

Participating clubs
 Clubs starting from the First Round: Gil Vicente, Estoril, Desportivo das Aves, Varzim, Santa Clara, Freamunde, Feirense, Oliveirense, Covilhã, Trofense, Fátima, Penafiel, Arouca, Moreirense, Belenenses, Leixões
 Clubs starting from the Second Round: Académica, Paços de Ferreira, Rio Ave, União de Leiria, Olhanense, Vitória de Setúbal, Beira-Mar, Portimonense
 Clubs starting from the Third Round: Porto, Sporting CP, Benfica, Nacional, Braga, Naval, Vitória de Guimarães, Marítimo

First round

Group A

Group B

Group C

Group D

Second round
The matches were played on October 10 to 28 (first legs) and November 10, 17 and 20, 2010 (second legs).

|}

Third round

Group A

Group B

Group C

Group D

Knockout phase

Semi-finals

Final

External links
Official webpage 
Official regulation 
Official statistics 

2010-11
2010–11 European domestic association football cups
2010–11 in Portuguese football